Frederick Charles Jamieson (May 18, 1875 – October 4, 1966) was a provincial politician from Alberta, Canada. He served as a member of the Legislative Assembly of Alberta from 1931 until 1935 sitting with the Conservative caucus in opposition.

Political career
Jamieson ran for a seat to the Alberta Legislature in a by-election held on January 9, 1931 as a Conservative candidate in the electoral district of Edmonton. He faced three other high-profile opponents including former MLA John Bowen and Elmer Roper. On election night Jamieson won the seat on the third vote to hold it for the Conservatives.

Jamieson ran for a second term in the 1935 Alberta general election but was defeated finishing in fourteenth place on the first vote count.

References

External links
Legislative Assembly of Alberta Members Listing

1875 births
1966 deaths
Politicians from Ottawa
Progressive Conservative Association of Alberta MLAs
Place of death missing